Ademar Frederico Duwe (11 June 1938 – 12 March 2021) was a Brazilian politician and businessman.

References

1938 births
2021 deaths
Brazilian politicians